Cormocyon is an extinct genus of borophagine canid native to North America. It is regarded as a primitive, transitional member of the Borophagini tribe.

References

The Terrestrial Eocene-Oligocene Transition in North America By Donald R. Prothero and Robert J. Emry 
Flynn, J.J., 1998. Early Cenozoic Carnivora ("Miacoidea"). pp. 110–123 in C.M. Janis, K.M. Scott, and L.L. Jacobs (eds.) Evolution of Tertiary Mammals of North America. Volume 1: Terrestrial Carnivores, Ungulates, and Ungulatelike Mammals. Cambridge University Press, Cambridge. 

Oligocene canids
Miocene canids
Oligocene genus extinctions
Cenozoic mammals of North America
Prehistoric carnivoran genera
Paleogene genus first appearances
Taxa named by Xiaoming Wang